WXNV-LP (105.1 FM) is a Christian radio station licensed to serve the community of Loganville, Georgia, United States. The station is owned by New Vision Outreach & Performing Arts Ministries, and airs an urban contemporary gospel format.

The station was assigned the WXNV-LP call letters by the Federal Communications Commission on February 7, 2015.

References

External links
 Official Website
 

XNV-LP
Radio stations established in 2016
2016 establishments in Georgia (U.S. state)
Gwinnett County, Georgia
XNV-LP
Urban contemporary radio stations in the United States